Sefikeng is a town in western Lesotho, located 30 kilometres to the east of the capital, Maseru, and 15 kilometres south of Teyateyaneng.

References
Fitzpatrick, M., Blond, B., Pitcher, G., Richmond, S., and Warren, M. (2004)  South Africa, Lesotho and Swaziland. Footscray, VIC: Lonely Planet.

Populated places in Lesotho